Electrico is a pop rock and indie Singaporean band originally formed as Electric Company in Singapore in 1996. This band is still active with the present line-up which includes David Tan, Desmond Goh, William Lim Jr.

History

1996–1997: Formation 
Electric Company was formed when David Tan, Keith Colaco, Desmond Goh and William Lim Jr. got together to entertain for a fun fair at their neighbourhood church. The band initially practised in an abandoned steel cargo container.  After three years of heavy gigging in the underground Singapore indie scene and developing a quasi cult status, the lack of support for local music and other problems forced Colaco to leave. The band continued briefly as a three piece but disbanded a year later.

2003–2005: Reformation and rename 
In 2003, lead guitarist Daniel Sassoon of Singaporean indie band Livonia joined the band. Soon after, the band's name was shortened from Electric Company to Electric Co., and finally to Electrico. Keyboardist Amanda Ling, was talent-scouted by the band members and joined the band in 2003 also.

In August 2004, Electrico released its debut album So Much More Inside. and their debut single 'I Want You' which shot to No.1 on Singapore radio station Perfect Ten 98.7FM's official Top20 weekly countdown chart in October 2004, as well as radio station Power98. Subsequent singles 'Runaway' and 'Good Time' were also considered big hits with fans and scored respectable positions on the charts as well.

To date, So Much More Inside has sold over 3000 copies at retail outlets and gigs. 

On 26 September 2005, the band was nominated in the Favorite Singapore Artist category at the Quantum Mechanics, which was repositioned as a global benefit for the tsunami victims in December 2004. As a result, they made history by being the first Singapore band to be nominated at the regional music TV channel's awards.

Electrico played alongside one of the Philippines' biggest rock bands, Rivermaya, at the latter's first showcase in Singapore that took place at Bar None, Marriott Hotel in October 25, 2005. The band stated that they're collaborating with Rivermaya on a song in their upcoming album.

On December 3, 2004, the band performs at Orchard Jam along with fellow Singapore rock bands "Ronin"

The band also performed live shows in the Southeast Asia region, including the Baybeats music festival in Singapore and the Pattaya International Music Festival in Thailand. The band opened for The Bravery when the New York-based band came to perform live in Singapore.

2006–2007: Rise through the Ranks 
After several months of promotions – with the band giving sneak previews of a few tracks from Hip City at a few of their gigs – the band was back in the studio to begin work on Hip City around August 2005. Initially scheduled for a late December 2005 release, it was later pushed back to 22 June 2006, due to several delays.

'Love In New Wave', the first single of Hip City, subsequently went on to become Electrico's second song earned a No.1 spot on  the Singaporean radio station 987FM's official Top10 chart show on 22 September 2006. The session in which Love In New Wave topped the chart happened to have lead guitarist Daniel Sassoon as its guest co-host for the day. The single also later went on to top the charts in the Philippines. The music video for 'Love In New Wave' was shot mostly inside Ministry Of Sound, Club Happy and at Haji Lane. It was directed by Carl Siahaan. Siahaan's sister, model/actress Desiree Siahaan made a guest appearance in the video.

Frontman David Tan revealed that all the songs in Hip City describe and reflect the current Singaporean music scene.

In November 2006, Electrico released their second single, a ballad called 'Hello'.

Love in New Wave charted No.32 in 987FM's Top100 Countdown of 2006. Electrico also won the Local Act of the Year (2006) accolade in 987FM's Top100 Special Category Nomination.

Love in New Wave also snagged the No.16 position in Power98's Top30 of 2006.

It was reported in Singapore's tabloid newspaper, TODAY, on 21 November 2006, that a special remix of Love in New Wave was done by Singaporean DJs Aldrin Quek and Akien, and that it became the latest dance anthem championed by British DJ Pete Tong on his high-profile Essential Mix series on BBC Radio 1 in England. 

TODAY ranked Hip City seventh in their Top10 list of memorable albums that you should rock out to on stereos overall for 2006 . Describing the album as 'Simple yet melodic, Electrico's Hip City gave naysayers – who claim "Singaporean rock" is an oxymoron – a rocking slap in face' & rated Love in New Wave as a key track. 

In February 2007, 987FM announced that Electrico's third single was to be 'We're Not Made in the USA'. During an interview with 987FM's Muttons in the Morning on 16 February 2007, Electrico announced that as soon as they returned from their USA trip, they would embark on an indefinite break to concentrate on writing new material for their upcoming still as-yet untitled third album.

'Hello' debuts at No. 17 in the 987FM Top 20 weekly chart, the highest debut for the week ending on 23 February 2007. It reached its peak position of No.8 in the week ending on 16 March 2007 on the same chart. Eventually, it drops to No.19 in the week ending on 13 April 2007, and finally bows out from the 987FM Top 20 in the week ending on 20 April 2007.

On 26 February 2007, Singapore broadsheet The Straits Times reported that Electrico's break from the limelight was scheduled to be from six months to a year, and that they would return sometime in late March 2008. Lead guitarist Sassoon was quoted saying, " The break will give us time to recuperate, evaluate the band and write new material."

On 21 May 2007, Electrico won their 2nd Top Local English Pop Song award at the 12th COMPASS awards ceremony for 'Good Time'.

2008–2009: We Satellites, breakup, National Day parade theme song 
The band had uploaded a new song titled 'Everybody's Here' on their official MySpace site.

On 10 March 2008, Electrico posted a message on their MySpace blog which revealed details of free exclusive download of Everybody's Here from 17 March onwards .

Lead singer David Tan said that the song was written for youths or anybody who feels lost, desolated, low in self-esteem, in despair, and all the negative things people face. Everybody's Here has been released on 987FM for the week 17 March 2008 .

On 13 May 2008, The Straits Times reported a press release by Electrico that lead guitarist, Sassoon had left the band on 7 April earlier in the year. The band said, "With his demanding and gruelling career in the legal sector, Sassoon had long wanted to take a break from the band to focus his energy on his legal profession.". Electrico decided against a replacement guitarist. Sassoon in an interview later and revealed he left the band due to different visions and formed a new band, In Each Hand A Cutlass.

On 27 May 2008, The Straits Times announced that Electrico won 2 awards at the 13th annual COMPASS awards ceremony .

They were awarded their 3rd Top Local English Pop Song for Runaway and frontman David Tan was awarded the COMPASS Young Composer of the Year.

Electrico has been nominated for 2 categories in the 3rd instalment of Power98 Singapore Music Awards. They were nominated in the Best Singapore Band and Best Local Song for Everybody's Here.

Electrico's 3rd album, titled We Satellites, was released in Singapore on 8 July 2008 . This album was less successful compared to their previous material. The lead single to be released from the brand new album is titled Save Our Souls .

On 10 June 2008, The New Paper announced that frontman David Tan has been awarded the Martell VSOP's Rising Personalities Award.

On 8 June 2009, The Straits Times reported that keyboardist Amanda Ling left the band in May, and that she had engaged a lawyer to review the band's accounts.

Electrico wrote the theme song What Do You See? for the Singapore National Day Parade, 2009, held on 9 August 2009 at The Float @ Marina Bay to commemorate Singapore's 44th year of independence, and performed the song at the event. The lyrics were cited by Prime Minister Lee Hsien Loong in his 2018 National Day Message.

The band performed at the One Movement For Music Perth (OMFMP) in October 2009. The band's trip to OMFMP was made possible with the sponsorship by GAC Events Asia, a company specialising in entertainment logistics.

After a two-year hiatus, Electrico returned to play the Baybeats festival at Esplanade – Theatres on the Bay in June 2013. It was also reported that the band was working on new music. The band also played at Music Matters Live.

In 2014, the band shared demo recordings of their new songs online. The songs, including "Eyes Wide Open", featured a more electronic vibe. Electrico's set at the Good Vibes Festival in Sepang, Malaysia in August was cancelled after severe weather, and the band organised a "pay-what-you-want" fundraising gig at The Substation in October instead. Reviewing the gig positively in TODAY, Kevin Mathews wrote that "the crowd was well into the performance — their enthusiasm certainly inspiring the band to give their best, despite some evidence of rustiness".

Peaks, awards, accomplishments and accolades

2004
 Debut single I Want You which was taken from their 2004 debut album So Much More Inside shot to No.1 on the then Singapore radio station Perfect 10 (now known as 987FM)'s official Top20 weekly countdown chart, giving Electrico their 1st No.1 hit.
 I Want You peaked No.1 position on the then Perfect 10 Top20 weekly countdown during the week of 23–30 October 2004.
 I Want Yous overall chart position on the then Perfect 10 Top100 of 2004 was a good No.14.

2005
 MTV Asia Awards Favourite Artist Singapore (Nominated) making history by being the first Singapore band to be nominated at the regional music TV channel's awards.
 Runaway peaked at No.7 on the then Perfect 10 Top20 weekly countdown during the weeks of 7–14 and 14–21 January 2005.
 Good Time peaked at No.17 on the then Perfect 10 Top20 weekly countdown during the week of 22–29 April 2005.
 Won popular street culture magazine I.S.' Readers Choice Awards for Best Local Band.
 Electrico opened for The Bravery when the latter staged its first concert in Singapore.

2006
 Won their 1st COMPASS award for Top Local English Pop Song category at the 11th COMPASS awards ceremony for I Want You.
 Won the popular street culture magazine I.S.' Readers Choice Awards for Best Local Band (for the 2nd consecutive year).
 Love in New Wave, the first single off their 2nd album Hip City, went to give Electrico their 2nd No.1 hit on Singapore radio station 987FM's official Top10 weekly chart show.
 Love in New Waves peak at No.1 on 987FM's Top10 weekly countdown during the week of 22–29 September 2006.
 Clinched 2 awards in the first Power98 Singapore Music Awards held by radio station Power98 and as voted by the public, emerged as winners in the categories for Favourite Singapore Band and Favourite Local Song for All The World.
 Love in New Wave was remixed by Singapore DJs Aldrin Quek and Akien & Tim Hudson in which subsequently the 2 remixes of Love in New Wave, namely the Aldrin and Akien Regroove and Tim Hudson Remix, made an appearance on the track list of the repackaged edition of Hip City as bonus tracks.
 Love in New Waves overall chart position on 987FM's Top100 Countdown of 2006 was a better No.32.
 Won the Local Act of the Year (2006) accolade in 987FM's Top100 Special Category Nomination.
 Love in New Waves overall chart position on Power98's Top30 of 2006 was an average No.16.
 Singapore tabloid newspaper TODAY ranked Hip City 7th in their Top10 list of memorable albums that "you should rock out to on your stereos" overall for 2006 . Describing the album as 'Simple yet melodic, Electrico's Hip City gave naysayers – who claim "Singaporean rock" is an oxymoron – a "rocking slap in face" & rated Love in New Wave as a key track.

2007
 Staged their maiden concert titled Love in New Wave which took place on 2 March 2007 at NUS's UCC Concert Hall.
 Hello peaked at No.8 on 987FMs Top20 Weekly Countdown during the week of 16–23 March 2007.
 Won Most Popular Band in the Motorola Super Stylemix Awards.
 Won their 2nd Top Local English Pop Song award at the 12th COMPASS awards ceremony for Good Time.
 Nominated for Best Local Song at the 2nd Power98 Singapore Music Awards for Love in New Wave.
 Won Best Singapore Band at the 2nd Power98 Singapore Music Awards.
 Love in New Wave reached No.1 for the week of 30 August 2007, on Nu107Fm, a radio station from The Philippines.
 Nominated In 987FM's Top100 Special Category Nomination, Nominations for Local Act of the Year and Local Song of the Year for Hello.
 Hellos overall chart position on 987FM's Top100 Countdown of 2007 was an average No.55.

2008
 Won their 3rd Top Local English Pop Song category at the 13th COMPASS awards ceremony for Runaway.
 Frontman David Tan was awarded the COMPASS Young Composer of the Year at the 13th COMPASS awards ceremony
 Nominated for Best Singapore Band at the 3rd Power98 Singapore Music Awards.
 Nominated for Best Local Song at the 3rd Power98 Singapore Music Awards for Everybody's Here.
 David Tan was awarded the Martell VSOP's Rising Personalities Award.
 Nominated for 'MTV Asia Awards Favourite Artist Singapore (Nominated).

Discography
So Much More Inside – released by Universal Music Singapore (August 2004), Australia (September 2004), Thailand (January 2005), Indonesia (March 2005)
Hip City – released by Universal Music Singapore (June 2006), Universal Music Malaysia (December 2006)
We Satellites – Warner Music Singapore (July 2008), Warner Music Malaysia (August 2008)

Singles

References

External links
 Official Site
 Official MySpace
 Unofficial Forums

Singaporean rock music groups
Singaporean indie rock groups